Bulbophyllum molossus is a species of orchid in the genus Bulbophyllum.

References

External links 
The Bulbophyllum-Checklist
The Internet Orchid Species Photo Encyclopedia

molossus

Flora of Madagascar
Orchids of Madagascar